Simonstone may refer to:

Simonstone, Lancashire
Simonstone, North Yorkshire